Year 1485 (MCDLXXXV) was a common year starting on Saturday (link will display the full calendar) of the Julian calendar.

Events 
 January–December 
 Spring – Multiple earthquakes occur near Taishan, China.
 March 16 – A solar eclipse crosses northern South America and Central Europe.
 June 1 – Matthias of Hungary takes Vienna, in his conquest of Austria (from Frederick III), and makes the city his capital.
 August 5–August 7 – The first outbreak of sweating sickness in England begins.
 August 22 – Battle of Bosworth: King Richard III of England is defeated by (rival claimant to the throne of England) Henry Tudor, Earl of Richmond; Richard dies in battle, and Henry Tudor becomes King Henry VII of England (although Henry marks this battle as August 21, so that he can declare all his opponents traitors).
 September 12 – Muscovian forces conquer Tver.
 September 15 – Peter Arbues is assaulted while praying in the cathedral at Zaragoza, Spain; he dies on September 17.  He had been appointed Inquisitor of Aragon by the Inquisitor General, Tomás de Torquemada, in the campaign against heresy and crypto-Judaism.
 October 30 – King Henry VII of England is crowned.
 November 2 – The Peace of Bourges stops the Mad War.

 Date unknown 
 Leon Battista Alberti's De Re Aedificatoria (written 1443–52 and published posthumously) becomes the first printed work on architecture.
 From about this date, Leonardo da Vinci produces a number of designs for flying machines, including the aerial screw or helicopter (probably unworkable).

Births 

 March 10 – Sophie of Brandenburg-Ansbach-Kulmbach, German princess (d. 1537)
 April 26 – Sibylle of Baden, Countess consort of Hanau-Lichtenberg (d. 1518)
 June 20 – Astorre III Manfredi, Italian noble (d. 1502)
 June 24
 Johannes Bugenhagen, German religious reformer (d. 1558)
 Elizabeth of Denmark, Electress of Brandenburg (1502–1535) (d. 1555)
 July 20 – Giovanni Battista Ramusio, Italian geographer (d. 1557)
 August 22 – Beatus Rhenanus,  German humanist and religious reformer (d. 1547)
 September 14 – Anna of Mecklenburg-Schwerin, Mecklenburgian royal (d. 1525)
 October 1 – Johannes Dantiscus, Polish poet and bishop (d. 1548)
 October 8 – Antonio Pucci, Italian Catholic cardinal (d. 1544)
 November 30 – Veronica Gambara, Italian poet and stateswoman (d. 1550)
 December 16 – Catherine of Aragon, first queen of Henry VIII of England, and daughter of Ferdinand II of Aragon and Isabella I of Castile (d. 1536)
 date unknown
 Hernán Cortés, Spanish conquistador (d. 1547)
 Odet de Foix, Vicomte de Lautrec, French military leader (d. 1528)
 Johanna of Hachberg-Sausenberg, ruler of Neuchatel (d. 1543)
 Giovanni da Verrazzano, Italian explorer (approximate date; d. c. 1528)
 probable
 Hugh Aston, English composer (d. 1558)
 Thomas Cromwell, 1st Earl of Essex, English statesman (d. 1540)
 Clément Janequin, French chanson composer 
 Sayyida al Hurra, Moroccan pirate queen
 Sebastiano del Piombo, Italian painter (d. 1547)
 John Russell, 1st Earl of Bedford, English royal minister (d. 1555)

Deaths 
 January 20 – Eustochia Smeralda Calafato, Italian saint (b. 1434)
 February 28 – Niclas, Graf von Abensberg, German soldier (b. 1441)
 March 16 – Anne Neville, queen of Richard III of England (b. 1456)
 August 7 – Alexander Stewart, 1st Duke of Albany, Scottish prince (b. c. 1454)
 August 15 – Albert II, Duke of Brunswick-Grubenhagen (b. 1419)
 August 22 (killed in the Battle of Bosworth Field):
 King Richard III of England (b. 1452)
 John Howard, 1st Duke of Norfolk (b. 1430)
 James Harrington, Yorkist knight
 Richard Ratcliffe, supporter of Richard III
 John Babington, High Sheriff of Nottinghamshire, Derbyshire and the Royal Forests
 Robert Brackenbury,  English nobleman, courtier and supporter of Richard III
 Walter Devereux, 8th Baron Ferrers of Chartley, supporter of Richard III
 William Brandon, supporter of Henry VII (b. 1456)
 August 25 – William Catesby, supporter of Richard III (executed) (b. 1450)
 October 17 – John Scott of Scott's Hall, Warden of the Cinque Ports
 October 27 – Rodolphus Agricola, Dutch scholar (b. 1443)
 November 4 – Françoise d'Amboise, Duchess of Brittany (b. 1427)
 Date unknown – Kristina Königsmarck, Swedish noblewoman.

References